"Veteran Cosmic Rocker" is a 1981 song by the progressive rock band the Moody Blues.  It was written by the band's flautist Ray Thomas.  "Veteran Cosmic Rocker" first appeared as the final track of the Moody Blues' 1981 album Long Distance Voyager, and was later released in November 1981 on the B-Side of "Talking Out of Turn."  

"Veteran Cosmic Rocker" is the third and final song in a suite that concludes Long Distance Voyager.  The first song in this suite is "Painted Smile," which is then followed by "Reflective Smile," a short poem connecting the themes of the two songs.  

Ray Thomas performs a harmonica solo about halfway through the song.  At the beginning of the song, Ray Thomas can be faintly heard saying the line "I'll have a Scotch and Coke please, Mother!" At the end of the song is a backward message in which Thomas can be faintly heard saying "What happens anyway, you know?"

Personnel
 Ray Thomas – lead vocals, flute, harmonica
 Justin Hayward – sitar, electric guitars
 John Lodge – bass
 Patrick Moraz – Minimoog, Mellotron, Oberheim Custon double 8-voice synthesizer, piano, Roland Jupiter-4
 Graeme Edge – Simmons electronic drums, Simmons Clap Trap drum machine, maracas, bell tree, drums
 Pip Williams – electric guitar, electric sitar

The Moody Blues songs
1981 songs
Songs written by Ray Thomas
Song recordings produced by Pip Williams